Castello may refer to:

Places
Castello, Venice, the largest of the six sestieri of Venice
Castello, the old town center of Giudicato of Cagliari in Sardinia
Castello, a neighbourhood in Florence
Castello, Hong Kong, a private housing estate in Hong Kong
A locality in the town of Monteggio in Switzerland
Cittadella (Gozo), a citadel in Gozo, Malta
Short name of Castellón de la Plana, a city in the Valencian Community, Spain

Other
Roman Catholic Diocese of Castello, a former diocese based in Venice
Castello (surname)
Castello cheeses

See also
Città di Castello, a town in Umbria, Italy
Castell (disambiguation)
Castella (disambiguation)
Castelli (disambiguation)
Castellón (disambiguation)
Castells (disambiguation)